Karkhaneh-ye Qand may refer to:
 Karkhaneh-ye Qand, Hamadan
 Karkhaneh-ye Qand, Razavi Khorasan
 Karkhaneh-ye Qand-e Shirvan